Argyrotaenia venezuelana is a species of moth of the family Tortricidae. It is found in Venezuela.

References

V
Endemic fauna of Venezuela
Tortricidae of South America
Moths described in 1863